The Kreuzer, in English usually kreutzer, was a coin and unit of currency in the southern German states prior to the introduction of the German gold mark in 1871/73, and in Austria and Switzerland.  After 1760 it was made of copper. In south Germany the kreuzer was typically worth 4 pfennigs and there were 60 kreuzers to a gulden.

Early history
The kreuzer goes back to a groschen coin minted in Merano in South Tyrol in 1271 (the so-called Etscher Kreuzer). Because of the double cross (German: Kreuz) on the face of the coin, it was soon given the name Kreuzer. It spread in the 15th and 16th centuries throughout the south of the German-speaking area. The Imperial Coinage Act of 1551 made them the unit for small silver coins.

In 1559 a value of 60 kreuzer to 1 gulden had been adopted throughout the southern states of the Holy Roman Empire, but the northern German states declined to join, and used groschen instead of kreuzer. The kreuzer in turn was worth about 4.2 pfennigs ("pennies"). Thus one (golden) gulden was worth 60 kreuzers or 252 pfennigs. Later currencies adopted a standard relationship of 240 pfennigs = 60 kreuzers = 1 gulden.

This was used in Austria-Hungary.

South Germany 1837–1873
The South German Currency Union of 1837 used a system of 60 kreuzers = 1 gulden and 1¾ gulden = 1 thaler, with the kreuzer equal to the old Kreuzer Landmünze. These kreuzers continued in circulation until decimalization, following the unification of Germany in 1871.

Austria-Hungary 1857–1892
Austria-Hungary decimalized in 1857, adopting a system of 100 kreutzers = 1 Austro-Hungarian florin. 1½ florins = 1 Vereinsthaler. The kreutzer was known as krajczár in Hungarian (krajcár in modern orthography), krejcar in Czech, grajciar in Slovak, krajcar in Slovene and Serbocroatian, creițar or crăițar in Romanian, grajcar in Polish.

See also 
 Groschen
 Pfennig

References

External links 

Silver coins
Currencies of Austria
Currencies of Germany
Currencies of Austria-Hungary